José Francisco Orozco y Jiménez (1864–1936) was archbishop of Guadalajara, Jalisco, Mexico from 1913 to 1936.

Biography
José Orozco y Jiménez was born in Zamora, Michoacán on November 19, 1864. He was ordained a priest in 1887 and appointed Bishop of Chiapas in 1902.

As Archbishop of Guadalajara, Orozco led protests against the secularization decrees imposed upon Mexican clergy in 1918. His tenure also saw an armed rebellion led by pro-Catholic forces against the Mexican government that occurred predominantly within his archdiocese. The rebellion is known as the Cristero War.

He died at his home in Guadalajara on February 18, 1936.

References

External links and additional sources
 Photo, from thefarsight2.blogspot.com
 (for Chronology of Bishops)
 (for Chronology of Bishops)
 (for Chronology of Bishops)
 (for Chronology of Bishops)

1864 births
1936 deaths
Cristero War
Mexican Roman Catholic priests
People from Zamora, Michoacán
Roman Catholic archbishops of Guadalajara
Mexican people of Basque descent
Contributors to the Catholic Encyclopedia